Poshtaveh may refer to:
 Poshtaveh-ye Olya
 Poshtaveh-ye Sofla